Montmartre (French: Montmartre sur Seine) is a 1941 French romantic comedy film directed by Georges Lacombe and starring Édith Piaf, Jean-Louis Barrault and Roger Duchesne.

The film's sets were designed by the art director Robert Dumesnil.

Main cast 
 Édith Piaf as Lily 
 Jean-Louis Barrault as Michel Courtin  
 Roger Duchesne as Claude  
 René Bergeron as Henri Lemaire  
 Huguette Faget as Juliette  
 Henri Vidal as Maurice Cazaux 
 Solange Sicard as Une invitée de Mousette  
 Champi as Monsieur Martin  
 Pierre Labry as Le cafetier  
 Gaston Modot as Le maître d'hôtel 
 Léonce Corne as Le père de Lily  
 Paul Demange as Le commissaire  
 Odette Barencey as La marchande des quatre saisons  
 Sylvie as Madame Courtin  
 Denise Grey as Moussette  
 Paul Meurisse as Paul Mariol

References

Bibliography 
 Rège, Philippe. Encyclopedia of French Film Directors, Volume 1. Scarecrow Press, 2009.

External links 
 

1941 films
French romantic comedy films
1941 romantic comedy films
1940s French-language films
Films directed by Georges Lacombe
Films set in Paris
French black-and-white films
1940s French films

fr:Montmartre-sur-Seine